The 2006 Atlantic Coast Conference men's basketball tournament took place from March 9–12 in Greensboro, North Carolina, at the Greensboro Coliseum. Duke won the tournament for the 16th time. Duke's J.J. Redick won the tournament's Most Valuable Player Award for the second year in a row.

The 2006 ACC Tournament was the first tournament with 12 teams participating. Boston College made its first appearance in the tournament, reaching the championship game before losing to Duke. 12th-seeded Wake Forest made a Cinderella run, beating 5th-seeded Florida State and 4th-seeded NC State on their way to the semifinal round, before losing to eventual champions Duke.

Miami and Boston College won their first ACC Tournament games in 2006. Miami defeated Clemson in the first round. Boston College defeated Maryland in the quarterfinal round.

Bracket

AP Rankings at time of tournament

External links
 

Tournament
ACC men's basketball tournament
College sports in North Carolina
Basketball competitions in Greensboro, North Carolina
ACC men's basketball tournament
ACC men's basketball tournament